There is no sex in the USSR () is a Russian catchphrase, that comes from the words of a Soviet participant of the Leningrad — Boston "tele-bridge" titled "Women Talk to Women", recorded on June 28 and broadcast on July 17, 1986.

History 
In 1986, two television hosts, the Soviet Vladimir Pozner and the American Phil Donahue, organized one of the first "tele-bridge" broadcasts of the Glasnost era, directed by Vladimir Mukusev. During the discussion, an American participant posed a question to Russian women:

The Soviet participant Ludmila Ivanova, an administrator in Hotel Leningrad and a representative of the "Committee of Soviet Women" replied:

The phrase was drowned in laughter and applause. Another Soviet participant said loudly:

In popular culture, the phrase morphed into "There is no sex in the USSR".

Appearance in culture 
The phrase "There is no sex in the USSR" is widely used in Russian to describe the prejudice and antissexualism of the Soviet culture and taboos of public discussion of topics related to sex. Conversely, supporters of the Soviet regime mention it as an example of a phrase taken out of context by the Soviet Union's detractors.

 A character of a bureaucrat played by Alexander Shirvindt in Eldar Ryazanov's 1987 comedy Forgotten Melody for a Flute is apologizing for allowing informal art by saying "There is no sex".
 The phrase is mentioned several times in the 1990 Soviet-Polish comedy Deja Vu.
 The phrase inspired the title of the 2004 Russian television drama Union Without Sex.

Citations 
In an interview to Komsomolskaya Pravda in 2004 Ivanova herself presented a somewhat different version of the story:

The fact that Ivanova completed the phrase by saying "We have love" was confirmed by the tele-bridge's director Vladimir Mukusev

Historical notes 
American ethnographer Kristen Ghodsee said that the sexual life of women under Socialism was, in fact, richer than under Capitalism thanks to the greater economic independence.

The tele-bridge incident was used by the Polish linguist Anna Wierzbicka as an example of the fact that even though sex as a phenomenon is "a given of human life", a word meaning sex does not exist in most languages of the world as it does in English, and when it does exist, it is often a loanword from English.

Ivanova herself later immigrated to Germany.

External links 

 The clip of the English-Russian exchange:

References 

Soviet phraseology
Russian words and phrases
Sexuality and society
History of human sexuality
Terminology by ideology
Sexuality in the Soviet Union
Television in the Soviet Union